Mattia Viel (born 22 April 1995) is an Italian cyclist, who currently rides for UCI ProTeam .

Major results
2017
 9th La Popolarissima
 10th Trofeo Città di Brescia
2018
 1st Six Days of Turin (with Nick Yallouris)

References

External links

1995 births
Living people
Italian male cyclists
Cyclists from Turin